French Hill (HaGiv'a HaTzarfatit, at-tel al-faransiya), also Giv'at Shapira, is an Israeli settlement in northern East Jerusalem. It is located on territory that has been occupied since the Six-Day War in 1967 and later unilaterally annexed by Israel under the Jerusalem Law, in a move internationally condemned as illegal, "null and void" under international law, in 1980. The international community considers Israeli settlements in East Jerusalem, such as French Hill, illegal under international law, which the Israeli government disputes.

Etymology

The source of the name French Hill is the fact that the land belonged to the Catholic Monastery of St Anne, whose monks hailed mainly from France. In 1926 the Monastery donated a plot of land to built a reservoir to store water that was pumped from Ein Farah, to supply the city of Jerusalem. An opening ceremony was held on 15 July 1926 and the location was reported in the newspapers as "the French Hill" (at the time in Hebrew in plural - Giv'at Ha'Zorfatim).

According to local legend, it was named after a British general, John French, 1st Earl of Ypres who is said to have had his headquarters on this hill. According to this legend there was a mistake with the translation to Hebrew that named the place after the country France (in Hebrew: Tzarfat). However, French never served in this region. Had the neighborhood been named for General French, the correct name in Hebrew would have been Giv'at French.

History
Under Jordanian rule, the area was a military outpost. According to Palestinian historian Walid Khalidi, a small number of Palestinians from Lifta moved to the area prior to 1967.

According to ARIJ, Israel confiscated land from the following Palestinian neighbourhoods/villages in order to construct French Hill in 1968:
394 dunams from Isawiya,
394 dunams from Shuafat.

In 1969, construction began on a new residential neighborhood to create a land link between West Jerusalem and the Hebrew University on Mount Scopus, which had been an Israeli enclave in Jordanian territory before the war. The official name of the new neighborhood was Giv'at Shapira. 

Then prime minister Levi Eshkol envisioned French Hill as the "first planned urban community in modern Jerusalem." In 2014, it was described as a clean, quiet neighborhood with bicycle trails, parks, fitness centers, a community center and many synagogues.

Another section of French Hill, Tzameret HaBira, was populated by American immigrants.

French Hill junction is one of the busiest junctions in Jerusalem, with tens of thousands of vehicles passing through it daily. As part of the French Hill tunnels project being implemented by the Jerusalem Municipality and the Ministry of Transportation, four tunnels are being built to ease the traffic congestion for residents travelling into the city.

Demographics
In 2002-2003, French Hill had a population of 6,631. Giv'at Shapira had a population density of 10.9 persons per dunam (10,900 people/km²), while Tzameret HaBira was less crowded, with 4.7 persons per dunam (4,700 people/km²). The population is mostly Jewish, including a large number of immigrants from South America and the former Soviet Union.In recent years, an increasing number of Arabs have been buying apartments in the neighborhood. The neighborhood has also seen a large influx of Orthodox Jews. The ethnic mix is much more diverse than in most other Jewish areas in the city, partly due to the proximity of the Hebrew University and Hadassah Hospital on Mount Scopus.

Schools and religious institutions
French Hill has 9 synagogues. One of them, Kehillat Ramot Zion, is a Masorti congregation. The first elementary school in Israel run by the movement, the Frankel School, was established in Givat Shapira (French Hill).

Economy
The Dan Jerusalem Hotel, originally the Hyatt Regency, has 502 guestrooms and suites, making it Jerusalem's largest hotel. The terraced structure was designed by Israel Prize-winning architect David Reznik.

Arab-Israeli conflict

The French Hill intersection which connects northern Jerusalem to Maale Adumim and the Dead Sea has been the site of eleven Palestinian terror attacks.

According to an article by the U.S. News & World Report, "the busy thoroughfare, which divides the Jewish neighborhood of French Hill from the Arab neighborhood of Shuafat, is the most accessible corner in the city for a West Bank terrorist looking for a crowd of Israelis."

In 2004, members of the al-Aqsa Martyrs' Brigade shot and killed George Khoury, an Israeli Arab economics student, while he was jogging in French Hill, having mistaken him for a Jew.

Archaeology
A 2,700 year old citadel with an open courtyard and rooms on both sides was discovered at the end of the 1960s on a hilltop on French Hill. Archaeologists believe it was part of a series of citadels built to guard Jerusalem during the First Temple Period.A salvage dig in 1970-1971 unearthed late Hellenistic and Herodian tombs. One of the 13 ossuaries discovered was inscribed with the name "Yehosef (Joseph) ben Haggai."

Notable residents
Yonit Levi
Jeff Seidel
Yossi Klein Halevi

References

Israeli settlements in East Jerusalem
Neighbourhoods of Jerusalem